The following is a timeline of the history of the city of Bristol, England.

Prior to 16th century

 803 – St James' Priory founded.
 ca.1000 – A Saxon settlement began to grow up at the junction of the rivers Frome and Avon.
 1009 – Market active.
 12th C. – College Green created.
 1129 – St James' Priory founded.
 1140 – St Augustine's Abbey founded.
 1141 – February: Stephen, King of England imprisoned in Bristol Castle after the Battle of Lincoln.
 1147 – Bristol fair active.
 1172 - Charter from Henry II.
 13th C. – Society of Merchant Venturers formed.
 c.1220 – Bristol Cathedral construction begins.
 c.1223 – Grey friary founded.
 c.1228 – Blackfriars Dominican priory established.
 1290 – Jews expelled.
 1292 – Church of St Mary Redcliffe built.
 1295 – Parliamentary representation begins.
 1373 – Bristol becomes a county corporate; Redcliffe becomes part of Bristol.
 1470 – St Stephen's Church rebuilt.
 c.1478–1479 – Ricart's Maiores Kalendar of Bristol started.
 1497 – May: Italian-born adventurer John Cabot sets sail on the ship Matthew (principally owned by Richard Amerike) looking for new lands to the west.
 1498 – May: Cabot sets sail on his second voyage to the Americas; he is never heard of again.

16th–17th centuries
 1504 – Chapel of the Three Kings of Cologne built.
 1542 – See of Bristol established.
 1552 – Society of Merchant Venturers chartered.
 1580 – Red Lodge Museum established.
 1595 – Merchant Venturers' School founded.
 17th C. – The trade in African slaves flourishes.
 1643 – July: Bristol in the English Civil War: Bristol taken by forces of Prince Rupert.
 1644 – Fort at St. Michael's Hill rebuilt.
 1645 – September: Bristol taken by forces of Cromwell.
 1656 – Bristol Castle demolished.
 c. 1670 – King William Ale House built as a refuge for poor women.
 1691
 Bristol Corporation of the Poor founded.
 Almshouse established at St. Michael's Hill.

18th century
 1701 – Merchants' hall built.
 1702 – Bristol Post-Boy newspaper begins publication.
 1710 – Colston's Hospital founded.
 1708 – Unrest.
 1709 – St James's Square laid out.
 1712 – Custom House built.
 1717 – William Cossley bookseller in business.
 1725 – Farley's Bristol News-Paper begins publication.
 1727 – Dowry Square laid out.
 1729 – Walter Churchman patents his invention for making chocolate.
 1737 – Bristol Royal Infirmary opens.
 1738 – William Champion patents a process to distill zinc from calamine using charcoal in a smelter.
 1739 – New Room (Methodist chapel) built.
 1740 – Merchant Tailors' Guild Hall built.
 1741 – King Square laid out.
 1743 – The Exchange built.
 1747 – Bristol becomes Britain's busiest slave trading port.
 1753 – Economic unrest.
 c.1759 – Joseph Fry begins chocolate manufacture.
 1766 – Theatre opens.
 1767 – Bristol Gazette newspaper begins publication.
 1768 – Bristol Bridge built.
 1769 – St Nicholas Church rebuilt.
 1770 – Bristol porcelain manufacture begins; Bristol blue glass is also first produced at about this date.
 1773 – Bristol Library Society founded.
 1779 – Stapleton Prison built to hold naval prisoners of war captured during the American Revolutionary War. 
 1786
 Infirmary opens.
 Wills, Watkins & Co. open a tobacconists' shop which becomes W.D. & H.O. Wills.
 1788 – John Wesley gives speech against slavery.
 c.1790 – Berkeley Square laid out.
 1791 – Christ Church with St Ewen and Equestrian Theatre built.
 1793 – 30 September: Bridge riot.
 1793–1813 – Stapleton prison used for French prisoners of war during the Napoleonic Wars.
 1796 – John Harvey & Sons, importers of Harvey's Bristol Cream sherry, founded.
 1799 – Pneumatic Institution established.

19th century
 1803 – Bristol Dock Company incorporated.
 1804 – Stapleton prison enlarged.
 1809 – Bristol Harbour formed.
 1810 – Commercial Rooms built.
 1821 
 13 April: John Horwood hanged at the New Gaol for the murder of Eliza Balsom.
 28 May: Population enumerated as 52,889.
 1823
 Chamber of Commerce founded.
 Bristol Institution opens.
 Bristol City Museum and Art Gallery established.
 1830 – New cattle market opens.
 1830s – Clifton becomes part of city.
 1831 – October: Queen Square riots – 4 rioters killed and 86 injured by cavalry charge in Queen Square.
 1832
 4 Queen Square rioters charged and hanged.
 Bristol Mechanics' Institution building opens.
 Holy Trinity Church built.
 1836 – Zoological Gardens open.
 1837 – Passage to St Vincent's Cave opens.
 1838 – 8 April: Paddle steamer  (launched 1837) begins her first voyage to the United States.
 1840
 31 August: Bath–Bristol section of Great Western Railway begins operating and Bristol Temple Meads railway station opens.
 Bristol and Clifton Ladies' Anti-Slavery Society instituted.
 1841
 14 June: First section of Bristol and Exeter Railway opens to Bridgwater.
 30 June: Great Western Railway opens throughout between London and Bristol; Bristol Temple Meads railway station substantially complete.
 1842
 Synagogue opens in Park Row.
 Buckingham Baptist Chapel built.
 1843 – 19 July: Iron steamship  launched.
 1844 – Bristol Academy for the Promotion of Fine Arts founded.
 1847 – Horfield Barracks completed.
 1850
 Bristol, West of England and South Wales Permanent Building Society formed.
 Pro-Cathedral of the Holy Apostles (Roman Catholic) consecrated.
 Clifton Victoria Baths opened.
 1858
 Western Daily Press newspaper begins publication.
 Bristol General Hospital opens.
 1861 – Durdham Down and Clifton Down rights acquired.
 1862
 Bristol Naturalists' Society established.
 Clifton College opens.
 1864
 Clifton Suspension Bridge opens.
 Avonside Engine Company in business.
 1865
 Bristol and West of England Amateur Photographic Association formed.
 Industrial Exhibition held.
 Daily Bristol Times and Mirror newspaper in publication.
 1867 – Bristol Beacon concert hall opens as Colston Hall.
 1870 – Gloucestershire County Cricket Club formed.
 1871 – Bristol Museum and Library established.
 1872 – Bristol Harbour Railway opened.
 1873 – Bristol Trades Council founded.
 1875 – Bristol Tramways (horse-drawn) begin operation.
 1876
 University College, Bristol opens.
 The Bristol and Gloucestershire Archaeological Society founded.
 1877 – Avonmouth dock opens.
 1884 – Clifton Antiquarian Club founded.
 1887 
 1 October: Bristol Tramways and Carriage Company formed by merger of the Bristol Tramways Company and the Bristol Cab Company and begins a horse-bus service to Clifton. 
 Bristol Camera Society established.
 Bristol Home for Lost and Starving Dogs opens.
 1889
 Labour strike.
 Bristol Choral Society founded.
 March: Flood.
 1892 – Labour strike.
 1893 – Brazil, Straker & Co (motor vehicle manufacturers) in business.
 1895 – Bristol Tramways begin operating with electric traction.
 1898 – Cabot Tower built on Brandon Hill.
 1899 – The chief magistrate becomes a lord mayor.

20th century
 1901
 Imperial Direct West India Mail Service begins operating to Jamaica.
 Population: 328,945.
 Area of city: 11,705 acres.
 1904
 Shirehampton becomes part of city.
 Area of city: 17,004 acres.
 1905 – Bristol Kyrle Society founded.
 1906
 January: Bristol Tramways and Carriage Company introduces its first motor buses.
 4 October: Great Western Railway opens Bristol Harbour Extension Railway and Canon's Marsh goods branch.
 Bristol Central Library opened.
 1908 – Royal Edward Dock opens at Avonmouth.
 1909 – University of Bristol receives Royal Charter.
 1910 – British and Colonial Aeroplane Company in business.
 1912 – Bristol Hippodrome opens.
 1914 – 29 June: International Exhibition opens at the "White City", Ashton Gate, becoming a military depot soon after the outbreak of war.
 1916
 August: First tanks shipped to France from Avonmouth.
 9 September: Bristol F.2 Fighter aircraft first flies.
 1926 – Hanham Colliery closes.
 1929 – Bristol Record Society founded.
 1930 – Whitchurch Airport begins operating.
 1932
 23 February: Old Market riot.
 7 March: Bristol Evening Post newspaper begins publication.
 1933
 Gaiety Cinema opens.
 Ribena first manufactured, by H. W. Carter.
 1934 – 18 September: BBC Bristol Studios open.
 1938 – Ritz Cinema opens.
 1940 – 2 November: Bristol Blitz (aerial bombing by German forces) begins.
 1941 – 11 April: Bristol Tramways abandoned due to bomb damage to its electric power supply.
 1944 – 15 May: Bristol Blitz ends.
 1945 – Bristol Cars in business.
 1946 – Bristol Old Vic theatre company and Bristol Old Vic Theatre School established.
 1956 – 17 April: Chew Valley Lake in Somerset is inaugurated as a reservoir for the Bristol area by the Queen.
 1957 – Bristol Airport opens.
 1958 – Bristol bus station opens.
 1959 – Bristol Siddeley aero engine manufacturer in business.
 1963 – 30 April: Bristol Bus Boycott.
 1968 – World Professional Billiards and Snooker Association headquartered in city.
 1969 – 9 April: British prototype Concorde airliner first flies from Filton.
 1970
 5 July:  returns to Bristol.
 4 September: BBC Radio Bristol begins broadcasting.
 Purdown BT Tower, for telecommunications and a radio repeater, is built.
 Bristol Polytechnic established from Merchant Venturers Technical College.
 1972 – 1 May: Bristol Parkway railway station opens.
 1973 – 29 June: Clifton Cathedral (Roman Catholic) consecrated.
 1974
 1 April: Bristol becomes part of the county of Avon
 May: Avonmouth Bridge opens in Shirehampton.
 c. July: Ashton Court Festival begins.
 1977 – Gay Pride begins.
 1978
 Royal Portbury Dock opens.
 Castle Park laid out.
 Bristol Gay Centre founded.
 1980 – 2 April: St. Pauls riot.
 1984
 1 May: Old Profanity Showboat opens.
 Bristol Community Church organised.
 1986 – Show of Strength Theatre Company formed.
 1991 – 27 January: Following its purchase by the Chiltern Radio Group, Bristol station FTP is replaced by Galaxy Radio.
 1992
 16 July: Hartcliffe riot.
 University of the West of England granted university status.
 1996 
 1 April: County of Avon abolished; Bristol once again becomes both a city and a county.
 24–27 May: First International Festival of the Sea held in and around the Harbour; replica 15th-century ship Matthew dedicated.
 19 July: MoD Abbey Wood opened at Filton.
 City of Bristol College established by merger of Brunel College and South Bristol College.
 1998 – Tobacco Factory Theatre established.
 2000 – Shakespeare at the Tobacco Factory theatre company founded.

21st century

 2001 – Bristol Royal Hospital for Children building opens.
 2003 – Plain Clothes Theatre Productions formed.
 2004 – Bristol Shakespeare Festival begins.
 2006 – Redland Green School built.
 2007 – 26–27 May: Dot to Dot Festival first held in Bristol.
 2009 – The Bottle Yard Studios open as a television and film production facility.
 2010 – Brunel Institute opens.
 2011
 21 April: Stokes Croft riot, including an attack on a locally controversial newly opened Tesco store.
 Bristol becomes a "city of sanctuary" for refugees.
 2012 – 19 November: Architect George Ferguson takes office as the first elected Mayor of Bristol.
 2020
 10 February: Councillors reject a proposed expansion of Bristol Airport, by 18 votes to seven, on the grounds that it would exacerbate climate change, damage the health of local people, and harm flora and fauna.
 7 June: The 1895 statue of Edward Colston, a 17th-century merchant, slave trader, MP and philanthropist, is pulled down by anti-racism protesters.
 2 December: COVID-19 pandemic in the United Kingdom: Bristol enters Tier 3, the strictest level of restriction.
 3 December: An explosion at a waste water treatment works in Avonmouth kills 4.
 2022 – 4 September: Bristol Zoo closes at its Clifton site.

See also
 History of Bristol
 Timelines of other cities in South West England: Bath, Exeter, Plymouth

References

Further reading

Published in the 17th–18th centuries

Published in the 19th century

1800s–1820s
 
 
 
 
 
 
 
  v.2

1830s–1840s

1850s–1890s
 
 
 
 
 
 
 
 
 
 
 v.1: Civil history	
 v.2: Ecclesiastical history
 v.3: Civil and Modern History

Published in the 20th century 
 
 
  (articles reprinted from The Bristol Times and Mirror)

External links

 
 . Includes Bristol directories, various dates.
 Europeana. Works related to Bristol, various dates
 Digital Public Library of America. Works related to Bristol, various dates

Years in England
 
Bristol
bristol
Bristol-related lists